Guy Preston (June 1884 – 17 January 1947) was a South African cricketer. He played in five first-class matches for Border in 1909/10 and 1910/11.

See also
 List of Border representative cricketers

References

External links
 

1884 births
1947 deaths
South African cricketers
Border cricketers
People from Uitenhage
Cricketers from the Eastern Cape